Oakley "Tad" Hall III (May 26, 1950 – February 13, 2011) was an American playwright, director, and author. In 1978, after a very promising beginning to his career, he suffered massive head injuries in a fall from a bridge, and spent decades in recovery and in the process of creating a new life.

Early Life and Education
Hall was the eldest child of novelist Oakley Hall and photographer Barbara E. Hall, and the brother of  Sands Hall. In 1963 he enrolled at Phillips Academy in Andover, Massachusetts, where he first became involved in theatre. After being expelled, he returned to Los Angeles to live with his father, where he enrolled in the newly formed University of California Irvine.  

At Irvine, Hall met future collaborators Bruce Bouchard and Michael Van Landingham. He acted in numerous productions as part of the prestigious Irvine Repertory Theater, including a minor role in Clayton Garrison’s production of Marat/Sade by Peter Weiss, alongside lead actors Bob Gunton and Robert Cohen as well as Dark of the Moon by Howard Richardson and William Berney. In fall of 1968, Hall, Bouchard, and Steven Nesbit (another future Lexington collaborator) received scholarships to study at San Francisco’s American Conservatory Theater.

In 1969, at age 18, Hall made national news in refusing the draft, mailing back his draft card and citing US war crimes in Vietnam for his reason in doing so.

In 1970, he starred in a short film ‘’Dionysus and the Maenads’’, conceived by writer Blair Fuller. 

In 1974, he completed an MFA in writing from Boston University, studying under John Cheever.

Career
By age 28, he was a rising star in the New York theatre scene. In 1977, his play Mike Fink was optioned by Peter Clough and Mandy Patinkin, with a reading starring Patinkin and William Hurt produced for Joseph Papp at the Public Theater. Oakley founded and was the artistic director of the Lexington Conservatory Theatre in upstate New York, where his plays Grinder's Stand and Beatrice (Cenci) and the Old Man, and his stage adaptation of Frankenstein, enjoyed their première productions.

In 1976–1977 Hall translated and adapted Alfred Jarry's bizarrely comic and revolutionary 1896 French play Ubu Roi (called Ubu Rex) and its sequels, and directed them in New York City Off-Off-Broadway and at the Lexington Conservatory Theatre. The adaptations starred Richard Zobel, who also produced the play and created the masks for it.

The publication of Otis Bigelow's play The Prevalence of Mrs. Seal is dedicated to Hall.

Accident
In 1978, Hall suffered massive head injuries in a fall from a bridge. He eventually returned to California to live in Nevada City near his family; there his play Grinder's Stand, which he had been writing at the time of his accident, was produced by The Foothill Theatre Company, directed by Philip Sneed. The story of this production, entwined with Oakley's fall and the slow process of creating a new life, are movingly told in Bill Rose's award-winning documentary, The Loss of Nameless Things.

Later Life
In 1990, Hall submitted his play A Dying Art for consideration at the Reality Theatre Company's new play festival in Columbus, Ohio. It was selected for a staged reading that year. After revisions working with producing director Frank Barnhart and Artistic Director Dee Shepherd, it received a full production at the theatre in 1991, where it was noted as a highlight of the festival by The Columbus Dispatch.

Hall made a lifelong study of the pre-surrealist playwright Alfred Jarry, and over the years translated several of Jarry's plays from the original French. In 2008, he moved to Albany, New York to live with Hadiya Wilborn, who fostered a collaboration with acclaimed puppeteer Ed Atkeson. This resulted in a production of Jarry's Ubu Rex, performed by the Firlefanz Puppets at Steamer No. 10 Theatre in Albany, New York, directed by Oakley, with actor Steven Patterson in the title role. In the fall of 2010, Moving Finger Press published Oakley's novel, Jarry and Me, in which Oakley intertwines a memoir of his own life with a sly "autobiography" of Jarry. One of the last sentences of the book is, "Jarry dies with a grin on his face."

On February 13, 2011, Hall died of a heart attack at his Albany home.  He is survived by his two children, Oakley and Elizabeth.

Some of Hall's writings are available online at www.absintheurpress.com, in a collection which is continually being supplemented.

The Highlander Theater Company of Chase Collegiate School in Waterbury, Connecticut performed Oakley Hall III's Frankenstein in March 2012, directed by Robert Cutrofello, currently an English teacher and playwright in Hamden Hall Country Day School. This was the first production of this play in three decades.

Plays
Produced Plays
  Doorman
  Mike Fink
  Frankenstein (based on the novel by Mary Shelley)
  A Dying Art
  Grinder's Stand
  Beatrice (Cenci) and the Old Man (based on the 1935 play by Antonin Artaud)

Unproduced Plays
 Melmoth the Wanderer (based on the 1820 novel by Charles  Maturin)
 The Monks of Monk Hall (based on the 1945 novel by George Lippard)
 The Moonstone (based on the 1871 novel by Wilkie Collins)
 The Occultation and Lumification of Mr. Ubu

Cultural references
Hall has been mentioned in music, including The Tigersharks' "The Ballad of Oakley Hall III"

References

Bibliography

External links
The Loss of Nameless Things (2004) – documentary on Hall, his life, accident, and recovery

Writers from New York (state)
1950 births
2011 deaths
University of California, Irvine alumni
Boston University alumni
French–English translators
20th-century American dramatists and playwrights
20th-century American translators
American male dramatists and playwrights
20th-century American male writers